Victor Edward Jackson (25 October 1916 – 30 January 1965) was an Australian first class cricketer who played for New South Wales and Leicestershire County Cricket Club.

From Australia to Cahn's XI 

Jackson made his first class debut during the 1936/37 Sheffield Shield season with New South Wales.He was brought over to Britain by Sir Julien Cahn who raised a powerful private side based at his home at Stanford Hall. Along with Jack Walsh, Jackson played non-championship matches with Leicestershire  against the Australian side. He played against Oxford University the following year. He played frequently for Cahn's XI in non first class matches but played against Glamorgan and on tour against New Zealand (1938/1939) in first class matches.He returned to Australian to appear in eight matches during the 1940/1941 season, including one in the DG Bradman's XI v YV Richardsons XI testimonial game

County cricket 
It was after the war that he returned to make his Championship debut in 1946 County season. He took 88 wickets at 21.90 and passed 1000 runs.

Vic Jackson was prominent allrounder, bowling off breaks at a brisk pace with a rather low arm that meant that he sometimes bowled a slow looping delivery. He played with Leicestershire until 1956, scoring 14379 runs and taking 930 wickets. His career best figures of 8 for 43 were taken against Glamorgan in his final season. With the bat he scored 21 hundreds, scoring 170 against Northamptonshire in 1948 as his best. He passed a thousand runs, eleven times and took 112 wickets in 1955 to complete the double. He took over ninety wickets on three occasions.

League cricket 
Jackson played for Rawtenstall in 1957 and 1958 as a professional making two further first class appearances in the Torquay Festival. In the last, he captained a Commonwealth XI versus an England XI scoring 2 and 4 not out.

Death 
Jackson was killed in a traffic accident near a level crossing in New South Wales.

See also
 List of New South Wales representative cricketers

References

Sources
 Wisden 1939, 1940 and 1966
 A History of Leicestershire Cricket Vol 1 and 2  EE Snow (1949 and 1978)
 The Cricketer 1955, 1957

External links

1916 births
1965 deaths
Australian cricketers
New South Wales cricketers
Leicestershire cricketers
Commonwealth XI cricketers
Australian expatriate cricketers in the United Kingdom
Australian expatriate sportspeople in England
Cricketers from Sydney
Road incident deaths in New South Wales
Sir Julien Cahn's XI cricketers
North v South cricketers
D. G. Bradman's XI cricketers